Vegetarian bacon, also referred to as veggie bacon, vegan bacon, vegan rashers, vacon, or facon, is a plant-based version of bacon.

Nutrition 
It is high in protein and fiber, yet low in fat, and has no cholesterol. Many vegan bacon products are lower in salt than pork back bacon, and some have less than 10% of the fat. Two slices of one particular brand average  of food energy.

Range 
Brands include Morningstar Farms, LightLife, Quorn, Tofurky, Soy Boy, Sweet Earth, Upton's Naturals, and Hooray Foods.

In 2015, the Media Wales reported vegan restaurant Anna Loka in Cardiff served vegan rashers. In 2021, Aldi supermarkets in the United Kingdom added No Pork Streaky Bacon Rashers. Sainsbury's sold vegan sausages wrapped in vegan rashers during Christmas 2021. In 2023, Burger King added vegan bacon, made by La Vie Bakon, to its UK menus.

Homemade recipes 

Welsh chef Gaz Oakley makes a vegan version of bacon bits from coconut flakes. The Bangor Daily News reported that vegan expert Avery Yale Kamila said homemade vegan bacon can be made from shiitake mushrooms, rice paper, coconut, eggplant or banana peels. American musician Lizzo uses maple syrup to cook vegan bacon.

Vegetarian bacon can also be made at home by marinating strips of tempeh or tofu in various flavorings, such as soy sauce or liquid smoke, and then either frying or baking. Aficionados of raw food also use coconut meat as a bacon substitute. Seitan can also be formed into vegetarian bacon.

Food writer David Goldbeck suggests frying provolone cheese in a skillet to produce a bacon substitute he calls "cheeson".

Plant based recipes for vegetarian bacon often utilise seitan or rice paper. Flavourings include liquid smoke, nutritional yeast, smoked paprika and barbecue sauce.

See also
 List of meat substitutes
Vegetarian hot dogs
Vegetarian sausage
Meat-free sausage roll

References

Bacon
Meat substitutes